The USC Jane Goodall Research Center is a part of the department of Anthropology at the University of Southern California. It is co-directed by professors of anthropology Craig Stanford, Chris Boehm, Nayuta Yamashita, and Roberto Delgado.

The center was established in 1991 with the joint appointment of Jane Goodall as Distinguished Emeritus Professor in Anthropology and Occupational Science.  The Center offers USC students the chance to study in Gombe.

See also
USC Center for Visual Anthropology

References

External links
Official website
Jane Goodall Spreads Message of Hope
Gombe Chimps Archived on Video and CD-ROM (1996)

Biological anthropology
Anthropological research institutes
Centers of the University of Southern California
Jane Goodall
1991 establishments in California
Research institutes established in 1991